The hundred of Macclesfield  was an ancient division of the historic county of Cheshire, in northern England. It was known to have been in existence at least as early as 1242, and it was formed to a great extent from the earlier Domesday hundred of Hamestan. 

When the Hundred of Hameston was formed, the village which was later named Macclesfield was the principal settlement in East Cheshire. It became the location of administration for the Hundred of Hameston, and the Hundred Court was held there. It is not known when or why the village and Hundred became known as Macclesfield.

In 1361 Edward, the Black Prince was lord of the hundred, manor and borough of Macclesfield.

Parishes

Until 1866 the Hundred of Macclesfield contained, in addition to Macclesfield itself, the following eight ancient parishes:

Alderley
Astbury
Cheadle
Gawsworth
Mottram in Longdendale
Northenden
Stockport
Wilmslow

The Poor Law Amendment Act 1866 provided the townships contained within these parishes became Civil Parishes in their own right.

Courts
Courts, or Eyres, were normally held annually in the region, a week after the close of the County Court.  The Justice of Chester presided over the courts, and he would spend several days visiting each hundred in the region.

See also
Hundreds of Cheshire
Ancient parishes of Cheshire

Notes and references

Notes

Bibliography

Hundreds of Cheshire
Macclesfield